Simms Independent School District is a public school district based in the community of Simms, Texas (USA).

The district has three campuses - James Bowie High (Grades 9-12), James Bowie Middle (Grades 6-8), and James Bowie Elementary (Grades PK-5).

In 2009, the school district was rated "recognized" by the Texas Education Agency.

References

External links
Simms ISD

School districts in Bowie County, Texas